Woodhill is a locality in the Auckland Region of New Zealand. It is in the Western Ward of the Rodney District. Woodhill is approximately 6 kilometres northwest of Waimauku and 10 km south of Helensville on State Highway 16. The North Auckland Line passes through the area. The Woodhill Forest lies to the west.

History

The railway line reached Woodhill in the 1880s, and allowed expansion of the existing farming settlement. Ambury's Creamery shipped the cream by rail to be made into butter in Auckland. A post office was established, and a store opened up opposite the creamery, becoming a social centre until it was destroyed by fire about 1970. The Woodhill Hall was another centre for social gatherings. It contained a library in the late 1920s, and was also used for church services.

In the 1920s, planting of trees to reclaim the sand dunes to the west brought forestry workers to the settlement, and a pine tree nursery was created in Woodhill in 1934. A settlement was created on the hill for the workers and their families. After the forest was privatised in 1987, this settlement disappeared.

Education
The school celebrated its 126-year reunion in 2003. The school was one of the earliest established in West Auckland. Many children from as far away as Swanson would commute to Woodhill, until the Swanson School was established in 1888.

Notes

External links

 Woodhill School website

Rodney Local Board Area
Populated places in the Auckland Region
Populated places on the Kaipara River